Anton Jason Haig (born 8 May 1986) is a South African professional golfer.

Golf career 
Haig was born in Nelspruit. He turned professional on 1 September 2004 and plays on the Sunshine Tour and the Asian Tour. He has won four times worldwide with his biggest win to date occurring at the multi-tour sanctioned Johnnie Walker Classic in March 2007. This victory earned him full European Tour membership and propelled Haig into the top 100 of the Official World Golf Rankings.

After a poor 2009 season, Haig had to regain his European Tour card at qualifying school. Haig fared no better in 2010 and lost his card at the end of the season. Haig announced his retirement from professional golf in November 2011 due to back injuries. In March 2012, Haig announced he would be returning to professional golf and finished T-18 at the Handa Faldo Cambodian Classic on the Asian Tour.

Amateur wins
2001 Vodacom Champions (South Africa)
2003 South African Amateur, South African Boys Championship

Professional wins (10)

European Tour wins (1)

1Co-sanctioned by the Asian Tour and the PGA Tour of Australasia

European Tour playoff record (1–0)

Asian Tour wins (2)

1Co-sanctioned by the European Tour and the PGA Tour of Australasia

Asian Tour playoff record (1–0)

Sunshine Tour wins (2)

Big Easy Tour wins (1)

IGT Pro Tour wins (5)

Results in World Golf Championships

"T" = Tied

See also
2009 European Tour Qualifying School graduates

References

External links

South African male golfers
Sunshine Tour golfers
Asian Tour golfers
European Tour golfers
People from Mbombela
White South African people
1986 births
Living people
21st-century South African people